Eleanor Dawson is a judge currently serving on the Federal Court of Appeal, and is a former judge on the Federal Court of Canada.

References

Living people
Judges of the Federal Court of Canada
Judges of the Federal Court of Appeal (Canada)
Canadian women judges
People from Burnaby
Year of birth missing (living people)